The 1977 Iowa State Cyclones football team represented Iowa State University during the 1977 NCAA Division I football season as a member of the Big Eight Conference (Big 8). The team was led by head coach Earle Bruce, in his fifth year, and they played their home games at Cylcone Stadium in Ames, Iowa. They finished the season with a record of eight wins and four losses (8–4, 5–2 Big 8), which included a loss to NC State in the Peach Bowl.

Schedule

Roster

Game summaries

Wichita State

at Iowa

Source: Palm Beach Post

Bowling Green

Dayton

Missouri

at Nebraska

at Oklahoma

Kansas

Colorado

at Kansas State

Oklahoma State

Peach Bowl (vs NC State)

References

Iowa State
Iowa State Cyclones football seasons
Iowa State Cyclones football